Demetrio Capuzzimati (Albanian: Dhimiter Këpucmadhi) (February 15, 1557, San Marzano di San Giuseppe) was an Albanian Stradiot captain in Apulia, then part of the Kingdom of Naples, and was the son of a soldier who had fought with Scanderbeg. He was also the Baron of San Marino.

Name and career
Capuzzimati or Capuzzimadi is an italianized version of the Albanian ”këpucmadhe” meaning ”big shoe”. Capuzzimati fought against a conspiracy of the local barons during the years of 1459–1462. He also fought in the Italian wars against Francis I of France. On July 27, 1530, the royalty of San Marzano, together with the title of Baron, was sold by the viceroy of Naples, Cardinal Pompeo Colonna, to Capuzzimati for 700 ducats, which he used as a place for immigrating Albanian families. The same year, he was appointed by Charles V. He died in 1557 and his oldest son Cesare inherited his wealth. He died in 1595. His successor was his son Demetrius junior in 1595. The same year, the Royal Chamber expropriated the wealth of Demetrius and sold it in an auction in 1639 for 20,000 ducats to the Duke of Taurisano, Franceso Lopez of Royo, of Spanish origin

References 

1480 births
1557 deaths
16th-century condottieri
Italian people of Albanian descent